Werner Schraut (born 25 April 1941) is a German weightlifter. He competed at the 1972 Summer Olympics and the 1976 Summer Olympics.

References

External links
 

1941 births
Living people
German male weightlifters
Olympic weightlifters of West Germany
Weightlifters at the 1972 Summer Olympics
Weightlifters at the 1976 Summer Olympics
People from Groß-Umstadt
Sportspeople from Darmstadt (region)